The 2018 Mr. Olympia contest was a weekend long IFBB professional bodybuilding competition that was held on September 14 to 15, 2018, in Las Vegas, Nevada. This was the 54th Mr. Olympia competition celebrated. The weekend competition is also known as the Joe Weider's Olympia Fitness and Performance Weekend. While the main event was the competition for the title of Mr. Olympia, several other events were held which includes the Amateur competition and sports expo.

On September 12, 2018, a press conference was held on Orleans Arena.

On September 13, 2018, prejudging and finals for Fitness Olympia, Figure Olympia and Classic Physique were held and livestream via Amazon Prime. Mr. Olympia pre-judging was also held on the same night.

On September 15, 2018, the Men's Physique Olympia and Women's Physique Olympia judging and finals were held in the morning at Las Vegas Convention Center. At night, the Bikini Olympia, 212 Olympia and Mr. Olympia finals were held at Orleans Arena.

On September 17, 2018, an Olympia Superstar Seminar was held.

Shawn Rhoden won his first Mr Olympia title, defeating seven-time defending champion Phil Heath.

Heath was attempting to tie the record for the most Mr. Olympia wins with eight, held jointly by Lee Haney (1984–1991) and Ronnie Coleman (1998–2005).

Rhoden became the oldest bodybuilder to win the Mr. Olympia title, at the age of 43 years, 5 months.

Results

Other results
 Flex Lewis won his 7th consecutive 212 Olympia title, then announced he will no longer compete in the 212 division.
 Angelica Teixeira is the 2018 Bikini Olympia Champion.
 Brandon Hendrickson won the Men's Physique Olympia title.
 Shanique Grant won the Women's Physique Olympia title.
 Breon Ansley won the Classic Physique title for the second consecutive time.
 Whitney Jones won Fitness Olympia title.
 Cydney Gillon won the 2018 Figure Olympia title for the second consecutive time.

References

External links
 Official website

Mr. Olympia
2018 in bodybuilding
Mr. Olympia
Mr. Olympia 2018